This is a list of family relations in the National Hockey League. Since the creation of the National Hockey League in 1917, family members have been involved in all aspects of the league. Although most connections are among players, there have been family members involved in coaching and managing as well.

Since 1917, 47 pairs of brothers have played together on the same team; among them, ten have won the Stanley Cup together. Brothers have also squared off against each other five times in the Stanley Cup finals, most recently in 2003. Twenty-six sons have followed in their fathers' footsteps and played for his team. Only once has a father played with his sons, when Gordie Howe played with Mark and Marty for one season with the Hartford Whalers.

The Chicago Blackhawks have seen the most familial connections with 31: twenty sets of brothers, five father-son combinations, three uncle-nephew combinations, and three sets of cousins.

The Sutter family has had the largest number of family members – nine – play, coach and manage in the NHL.  The original six brothers (Brent, Brian, Darryl, Duane, Rich, and Ron) and three of their sons (cousins Brandon, Brett, and Brody) result in multiple brother/father-son/uncle-nephew/cousin combinations.

Below is a list of family relations throughout the NHL as players, head coaches, general managers, and officials. Owners are not included, as inheritance makes these relations more routine.

Names in bold have won the Stanley Cup. Names in italics are members of the Hockey Hall of Fame. An asterisk (*) denotes a current (2021–22 season) NHL player.

Siblings

Parent-children

Grandfather-grandsons
This category is for such pairings not already listed in the "Parent-Children" section above (i.e., maternal grandparents): grandfathers Paulin Bordeleau, Bernie Geoffrion, Bryan Hextall, Lester Patrick, Jerry Wilson.

Great-grandfather & great-grandson

Uncles-nephews
This category is for such pairings not already listed in the "Father-Son" & "Siblings" sections above.

Grand-uncle & grand-nephews

Great, grand-uncle & great, grand-nephew

Cousins

In-law
This category is for pairings of in-laws.

References

External links
The Hockey Hall of Fame
Hockey Draft Central

 
Family
Ice hockey-related lists
Family
American ice hockey-related lists
Canadian ice hockey-related lists
Lists of sports families